The 56th Assembly District of the Wisconsin is one of 99 districts in the Wisconsin State Assembly.  Located in east-central Wisconsin, the district comprises areas of southwest Outagamie County.  It includes much of the north side of the city of Appleton. The district is represented by Republican Dave Murphy, since January 2013.

The 56th Assembly District is located within Wisconsin's 19th Senate district, along with the 55th and 57th Assembly districts.

List of past representatives

References 

Wisconsin State Assembly districts
Outagamie County, Wisconsin
Winnebago County, Wisconsin